The list of DFB-Pokal top scorers includes the all-time top scorers of the DFB-Pokal, as well as the top scorers of each season of the competition since its inception as the Tschammerpokal in 1935. Gerd Müller is the all-time top scorer in the DFB-Pokal, having scored 78 goals in 62 appearances for Bayern Munich. The record for the most seasons as top scorer is held by Robert Lewandowski, with five titles. So far only Dieter Müller and Hannes Löhr of 1. FC Köln, along with Claudio Pizarro and Lewandowski of Bayern Munich  have successfully defended their title as top scorers. Dieter Müller holds jointly with Ernst Wilimowski of 1860 Munich the record of the most goals scored in a single cup campaign, with 14.

All-time top scorers

The table includes all players to have scored 20 or more goals.

Note

Top scorers by season
The following lists all of the top scorers in each individual season.

Tschammerpokal

DFB-Pokal

Rankings

By player

By club

By nationality

See also
 List of Bundesliga top scorers

References

Top scorers
Germany DFB
Germany DFB
Association football player non-biographical articles